Several projects have been planned and undertaken to launch paper planes from the stratosphere or higher.

2008 Japanese project
Japanese scientists and origami masters considered in 2008 launching a flotilla of paper planes from space. The launch was tentatively slated for 2009 from the International Space Station 250 miles above Earth. However, the planes' developers, Takuo Toda (see paper plane world records) and fellow enthusiast Shinji Suzuki, an aeronautical engineer and professor at Tokyo University, postponed the attempt after acknowledging it would be all but impossible to track the planes during their week-long journey to Earth, assuming any of them survived the searing descent. The developers continue, in 2009, with hopes that China or Russia will back further efforts on the project. 

Some 30 to 100 planes had been considered to make the descent, each gliding downward over what was expected to be the course of a week to several months.  If one of the planes survived to Earth, it would have made the longest flight ever by a paper plane, traversing the 250 mi./400 km. vertical descent. In a test in Japan in February 2008, a prototype about 2.8 inches long and 2 inches wide survived Mach 7 speeds and temperatures reported to be 200°C in a hypersonic wind tunnel for 10 seconds. Materials designed for use in conventional reentry vehicles, including ceramic composites, withstand temperatures on the order of 2200°C. The 30 cm planes were to have been made from heat-resistant paper treated with silicon.

As the Japanese/JAXA project was outlined, scientists would have had no way to track the airplanes or to predict where they might land; and as 70% of the Earth's surface is covered in water, the craft would have anticipated a wet reunion with the planet.  Each plane, however, would have borne a request in several languages asking its finder to contact the Japanese team.  Should one of the airplanes thus have made its way home, its journey would have helped to demonstrate the feasibility of slow-speed, low-friction atmospheric reentry.  Critics have suggested that even a successful demonstration would lack probative impact beyond the realm of diminutive sheets of folded paper—they can only fall. Supporters countered that the broadening of knowledge was justification enough.

PARIS project

The work was undertaken by a team of British space enthusiasts working on behalf of the information technology web site The Register.

The use of the word "space" in the project's name refers to "near space," not "outer space", since it was not planned for the vehicle to ascend to an altitude above the Kármán line.

Other projects

In February 2011, 200 planes were launched from a net underneath a weather balloon twenty-three miles above Germany. The planes were designed to maintain stable flight even in gusts up to 100 mph. The planes were equipped with memory chips from which data can be uploaded. Planes were subsequently recovered from Europe, North America and Australia.

See also
Paper Aircraft Released Into Space
Space debris

References

External links
 The Ultimate Paper Airplane
 Origami Plane To Be Launched From Space
 Scientists Aim For Origami Space Flight
 Can Japan's Paper Plane Fly In Space?
 Japan To Launch Origami Planes Into Outer Space
 Reported in the Chronicle of Higher Education
 BBC News - Amateur space enthusiasts launch paper plane into space (November 2010)

Paper planes
Spaceflight